Nuestra Belleza Nuevo León 2011, was held at Las Lomas Eventos in Monterrey, Nuevo León on July 12, 2011. At the conclusion of the final night of competition Ivette García of Monterrey was crowned the winner. García was crowned by outgoing Nuestra Belleza Nuevo León titleholder and Nuestra Belleza Mundo México 2010 Cynthia de la Vega. Nine contestants competed for the title.

Results

Placements

Special awards

Judges
Elsa Burgos - Television Hostess & Miss Costa Maya International 2002
Arturo Carmona - Actor
Ana Laura Corral - National Coordinator of Nuestra Belleza México
Ofelia Correa - Regional Coordinator of Nuestra Belleza México
Juan José Origel - Journalist

Background Music
Río Roma - "Al Fín te Encontre", "Me Cambiaste la Vida", "No Lo Beses", "Por Eso Te Amo" & "Fan de La Luna"
Aarón Díaz - "Tu Tienes la Culpa", "Teresa" & "Mi Religión"
Gustavo Lara - "No Vuelvas a Pararte Frente a Mí", "Princesa" & "La Sombra de los Angeles"

Contestants

References

External links
Official Website

Nuestra Belleza México